The 1839 Chicago mayoral election saw Whig nominee Benjamin Wright Raymond defeat Democratic nominee James Curtiss by a landslide 25 point margin.

The election was held on March 5.

Campaign

With the nation enduring a difficult economic recession, many citizens believed that successful merchant Benjamin Raymond would be a wise choice for the city' next mayor. However, Raymond was initially not amenable to the prospect of serving as mayor. When former mayor William B. Ogden attempted to persuade him at his dry goods store to run for mayor, Raymond initially, "leaped over the counter and knocked Mr. Ogden's prostrate with a bolt of factory-cloth." However, Raymond was nonetheless eventually persuaded to run for mayor.

Results

References

Mayoral elections in Chicago
Chicago
1830s in Chicago